Harry Mehlhose (15 January 1914 – 29 June 1976) was a German middle-distance runner. He competed in the men's 1500 metres at the 1936 Summer Olympics.

References

1914 births
1976 deaths
Athletes (track and field) at the 1936 Summer Olympics
German male middle-distance runners
Olympic athletes of Germany
Athletes from Berlin